Bachlawa  (Bachliava) is a village in the administrative district of Gmina Lesko, within Lesko County, Subcarpathian Voivodeship, in south-eastern Poland.

The village has a population of 200.

References

Bachlawa